Echinochasmidae is a family of trematodes in the order Plagiorchiida.

Genera
Echinochasmus Dietz, 1909
Stephanoprora Odhner, 1902

References

Echinostomata
Trematode families